Barnard is an unincorporated community in Madison County, North Carolina, United States.  The community, originally known as Barnard's Station, was established as a post office as early as 1830; it was named for an early settler in the area.  Located along the banks of the French Broad River, in central Madison County, the community is accessible via Barnard Road (SR 1151), which connects to NC 213.  The Norfolk Southern S-Line also travels through the community.  The community is part of the Asheville Metropolitan Statistical Area.

References

Unincorporated communities in Madison County, North Carolina
Unincorporated communities in North Carolina
Populated places established in 1830